Brighton is a suburb 27 km north of Hobart, in Tasmania, Australia. It is between Pontville and the outer Hobart suburb of Bridgewater on the Midland Highway. At the 2016 census, Brighton had a population of 4,983.

History
From 1826 onwards, the township was the site of the Brighton Barracks, a military accommodation facility until sold off for subdivision in the early 2000s.

A Brighton Post Office opened on 1 June 1832. This was renamed Pontville in 1895 and closed in 1973. The current Brighton office opened on 22 May 1964.

A 42 kilometre railway line operated from Brighton to Aspley, commencing operations in 1891. Passenger services ended in 1927, and the goods service was replaced by trucks in 1947, with the line being removed shortly thereafter.

More recently it was used as emergency accommodation for refugees fleeing the conflicts in eastern Europe, namely Kosovo.

The area surrounding Brighton was swept with bush and grass fires over the summer of January 2003 with fires reaching Cartwright street, the old army camp and the Midland highway placing the town under extreme threat.

The Brighton area expected to see an increase in light industrial use, being serviced by both road & rail with the construction of the Brighton Transport Hub.

Brighton Training Centre
The area is also the site of a major horse racing training facility located at Brighton Racecourse known as the Brighton Training Centre, serving the thoroughbred, trotting & pacing industry.

Many good Tasmanian Thoroughbreds and Pacers have been trained at Brighton Racecourse since the early eighties including the 1986 Launceston Cup winner Epigram and Noble Sensation winner of the TRC Tasmanian Breeders Classic (LR), Thos Lyons S. (LR), TTC Gold Sovereign S. (LR), George Adams P. (LR); 2d TRC Tattersalls S. (LR), TTC Newmarket H. (LR), 3d VATC Autumn S. (G3), TTC Tasmanian Gns (LR), TRC Thomas Lyons S. (LR), Tattersall's S. (LR).

The Training centre is located north of the town centre on Racecourse Road. The original course proper was 2000 metres from start to finish and was home of the Brighton Cup until the racecourse was closed for training use only in 1973.

The course has undergone significant changes since the 1980s when a chipwood track was put in on the outer half of the course proper and a major redevelopment in late 2004 to become the present training centre with all training of horses ceasing at Elwick Racecourse along with the relocation of Elwick-based trainers to stables built along the back straight of the track.

Notable residents
 Frederick Royden Chalmers (1881–1943) farmer, soldier and administrator.
 George Peter Desailly (1823–1876) pastoralist
 Edward (Ned) Devine (1833–1908) coach driver
 John Ernest Cecil Lord (1870–1949) police commissioner and soldier

References

Localities of Brighton Council (Tasmania)
Localities of Southern Midlands Council
Towns in Tasmania